Haselberger is a German surname. Notable people with the surname include:

Christian Haselberger (born 1989), Austrian footballer and coach
Lothar Haselberger, German-American architectural historian, archaeologist, classical scholar, and writer

German-language surnames